Antithesis is the third album by the American rock band Gypsy, their first on the RCA Victor label.

Track listing
All songs by Enrico Rosenbaum except as noted.

 "Crusader" (James Johnson, Enrico Rosenbaum) – 3:10
 "Day After Day" (Randy Cates, James Walsh) – 3:15
 "The Creeper"  – 3:13
 "Facing Time"  – 4:12
 "Lean On Me"  – 3:13
 "Young Gypsy" (James Johnson)  – 3:06
 "Don't Bother Me" – 3:13
 "Travelin' Minnesota Blues" (Walsh, Rosenbaum) – 2:32
 "So Many Promises"  – 2:23
 "Antithesis (Keep Your Faith)"  – 3:21
 "Edgar (Don't Hoover Over Me)"  – 3:25
 "Money" – 4:51

Personnel
Enrico Rosenbaum - guitar, vocals
James Walsh - keyboards, vocals
James Johnson - guitar, vocals
Bill Lordan - drums
Randy Cates - bass, vocals

Production notes
Produced by Jack Richardson and Jim Mason
Engineered by Brian Christian

Charts
Single

References

External links
 Gypsy Tribute site

1972 albums
RCA Victor albums
Gypsy (band) albums
Albums produced by Jack Richardson (record producer)